Seyyed Nezam ol Din (also Romanized as Seyyed Nez̧ām ol Dīn, Seyyed Nez̧ām ed Dīn, and Seyyed Nez̧ām od Dīn) is a village in Sajjadrud Rural District, Bandpey-ye Sharqi District, Babol County, Mazandaran Province, Iran. At the 2006 census, its population was 1,033, in 267 families.

References 

Populated places in Babol County